Blackrock Mountain is located on the border of Alberta and British Columbia. It was named in 1921 by Arthur O. Wheeler for the black Ordovician rock present in the area.

See also
List of peaks on the Alberta–British Columbia border
Mountains of Alberta
Mountains of British Columbia

References

Blackrock Mountain
Blackrock Mountain
Canadian Rockies